Stony Island is a large island off of the coast of Labrador. Cooper Island lies to the south, Hawke Island to the north and Venison Island to the east. A small harbour named Tub Harbour is located on the west side of the island. A fishing station was established there in 1885 but had been abandoned by 1965.

References

Islands of Newfoundland and Labrador